Mount Tabor Methodist Episcopal Church may refer to:

Mount Tabor Methodist Episcopal Church (Crownsville, Maryland)
Mount Tabor Methodist Episcopal Church (West Liberty, Ohio)